Voco (stylized as voco) is an international hotel brand owned by the InterContinental Hotels Group. Since launching in 2018, voco has opened hotels in the UK, Australia, United Arab Emirates and Saudi Arabia. The name voco is derived from the Latin word meaning ‘to invite’ or ‘to come together’.  

The first locations include the rebranding of 12 hotels from Covivio and the 388-room Watermark Hotel in Gold Coast, Australia. 

In 2018, IHG leased thirteen luxury hotels in the UK;  voco St David's Cardiff Hotel became  the first voco hotel in Europe.

In 2021, IHG announced 50 hotels had signed up to carry the brand in more than 20 countries.

References

External links
 

InterContinental Hotels Group brands